Constantinos Sergiou (born 2 October 2000) is a Cypriot football player who plays as defender forNea Salamis in Cypriot First Division.

References

2000 births
Living people
Cypriot footballers
Cyprus youth international footballers
Association football defenders
Nea Salamis Famagusta FC players
Ayia Napa FC players
Cypriot First Division players